The White Ravens is a catalog annually published by International Youth Library as a recommendation list for child and youth literature. An annual White Ravens catalog is introduced each year at the Bologna Children's Book Fair in Italy.

Selection
From the large quantity of the review and donation copies, which the library receives from publishing houses, institutions, organizations and other friends of the library, the language specialists (lektors) select 200 new releases from over 40 countries in more than 30 languages. The titles are taken into consideration based on the interest of their universal topic and/or their innovative literary and picture-formative quality for a specialised international audience and if they will be well received. Each book listed in the catalog is briefly described with short annotations. Using identification symbols, the "special Mentions" are identified, as well as the books that are found to be a contribution to the communication between cultures and people, and easy-to-read texts, which also apply to the older readers. The catalog contains books from 81 countries and in 58 languages.

The White Raven label is given to "books that deserve worldwide attention because of their universal themes and/or their exceptional and often innovative artistic and literary style and design. The titles are drawn from the books that the IYL receives as review or donation copies from publishers and organisations around the world".

Books
An online catalog, which includes all titles from 1993 to 2007, is available on the International Children's Digital Library website, and there is an updated online database of titles hosted by the IYL, with an advanced search facility.

References

Children's books
Young adult literature
Culture in Bologna
Library catalogues